Andrey Kabanov (born August 9, 1971) is a Russian sprint canoeist who competed in the mid -1990s to the early 2000s (decade). He won nine medals at the ICF Canoe Sprint World Championships with four golds (C-4 200 m: 1994, 1999; C-4 500 m: 1999, C-4 1000 m: 1999), four silvers (C-4 500 m: 1993, 2002; C-4 1000 m: 1993, 1998), and a bronze (C-2 200 m: 1998).

Kabanov also finished sixth in the C-2 500 m event at the 1996 Summer Olympics in Atlanta.

References

1971 births
Canoeists at the 1996 Summer Olympics
Living people
Olympic canoeists of Russia
Russian male canoeists
ICF Canoe Sprint World Championships medalists in Canadian